Pippa Hale is a contemporary British artist, founder of the Northern Art Prize and co-founder of The Tetley Leeds.

Early life 

Pippa studied for a Foundation Diploma in Art and Design at Warwickshire College of Further Education in Leamington Spa, graduating in 1991 and going on at Leeds University graduating with BA (Hons) Fine Art in 1996.

Practice

Commissions 
In 2019, as part of a joint project developed by Rachel Reeves in partnership with Leeds City Council and Leeds Art University, Hale's work "Ribbons" was commissioned from a shortlist of three other artists to redress the imbalance of women portrayed within the public sphere.

Exhibitions 

 2019-20 Play Rebellion at the Baltic Centre for Contemporary Art, Gateshead originally commissioned as part the MAPS festival by Chalk.
 2019 PlayShapes for the MAPS festival by Chalk at the Baltic Centre for Contemporary Art, Gateshead.
 2019 Exhibition of shortlisted artists for Feminist Public Sculpture, Leeds Arts University Gallery
 2010 Beyond The Dustheaps, The Dickens Museum, London
 2009 Town and Country, PSL [Project Space Leeds] and Harewood House Trust
 2006 For The North, Generator Projects, Dundee
 2005 Launch Pad, Vitrine, Leeds
 2005 Multiples, LOT, Bristol
 2004 Thermo04, The Lowry, Salford
 2003 Artranspennine04, The Walker Art Gallery, Liverpool; Manchester Art Gallery; Leeds City Art Gallery and The Ferens, Hull
 2003 Last Few Days, The Merrion Centre, Leeds
 2000 Common Prayer, Gallery II, Bradford University
 2000 Guest House Twenty, Site Gallery and various locations in Sheffield in association with UTK

Personal life

Charitable work 

From 2008 to 2012 Hale was a council member of the Leeds Civic Trust, in the same period she also served as Secretary to the Leeds Visual Arts Forum. In 2015 she stepped down as co-Director of The Tetley and joined the board of trustees of its management company, Leeds Project Space where she served for a further three years, resigning from this role in 2018. She is currently a trustee of the education charity IVE.

References 

Living people
British artists
People from Leamington Spa
Alumni of the University of Leeds
Year of birth missing (living people)